Meghan Ann Cox (born November 15, 1994) is an American soccer player who plays as a defender.

Early life
Cox attended Robert E. Lee High School where she earned several honors and accolades in soccer. Cox was elected most valuable player (MVP) as a sophomore and as a junior. She earned the Golden Ball Award as the national championship MVP. Cox was included in the All-State First Team in her junior year. She was nominated two-time All-Northern Region, three-time All-Patriot District and two-time Washington Post All-Met.

Collegiate career
Cox attended James Madison University during her freshman year of college, playing 21 matches and scoring three goals for the Dukes. In her sophomore year, she transferred to the University of Virginia. She played three seasons for the Cavaliers, featured in 67 matches and scored 11 goals.

Club career
In April 2017 the Portland Thorns FC announced they had signed Cox. She debuted for the Thorns on April 22, 2017, replacing Meghan Klingenberg in the 46th minute of the match against North Carolina Courage. In August, she was waived and picked up by the Dash. She left the team after half a season and returned to the University of Virginia to complete her degree.

References

External links
 
 James Madison Dukes bio
 Virginia Cavaliers bio
 Portland Thorns profile

Living people
1994 births
American women's soccer players
Women's association football defenders
James Madison Dukes women's soccer players
Virginia Cavaliers women's soccer players
Portland Thorns FC players
Utah Royals FC players
National Women's Soccer League players
People from Springfield, Virginia
Sportspeople from Fairfax County, Virginia
Soccer players from Virginia